A hangar is a building or structure designed to hold aircraft or spacecraft. Hangars are built of metal, wood, or concrete. The word hangar comes from Middle French hanghart ("enclosure near a house"), of Germanic origin, from Frankish *haimgard ("home-enclosure", "fence around a group of houses"), from *haim ("home, village, hamlet") and gard ("yard"). The term, gard, comes from the Old Norse garðr ("enclosure, garden").

Hangars are used for protection from the weather, direct sunlight and for maintenance, repair, manufacture, assembly and storage of aircraft.

History

The Wright brothers stored and repaired their aircraft in a wooden hangar constructed in 1902 at Kill Devil Hills in North Carolina for their glider. After completing design and construction of the Wright Flyer in Ohio, the brothers returned to Kill Devil Hills only to find their hangar damaged. They repaired the structure and constructed a new workshop while they waited for the Flyer to be shipped.

Carl Richard Nyberg used a hangar to store his 1908 Flugan (fly) in the early 20th century and in 1909, Louis Bleriot crash-landed on a northern French farm in Les Baraques (between Sangatte and Calais) and rolled his monoplane into the farmer's cattle pen. Bleriot was in a race to be the first man to cross the English Channel in a heavier-than-air aircraft, and he and set up his headquarters in the unused shed. In Britain, the earliest aircraft hangars were known as aeroplane sheds, and the oldest survivors of these are at Larkhill, Wiltshire. These were built in 1910 for the Bristol School of Flying and are now Grade II* Listed buildings. British aviation pioneer Alliott Verdon Roe built one of the first aeroplane sheds in 1907 at Brooklands, Surrey and full-size replicas of this and the 1908 Roe biplane are on display at Brooklands Museum.

As aviation became established in Britain before World War I, standard designs of hangar gradually appeared with military types too such as the Bessonneau hangar and the side-opening aeroplane shed of 1913, both of which were soon adopted by the Royal Flying Corps. Examples of the latter survive at Farnborough, Filton and Montrose airfields. During World War I, other standard designs included the RFC General Service Flight Shed and the Admiralty F-Type of 1916, the General Service Shed (featuring the characteristic Belfast-truss roof and built-in various sizes) and the Handley Page aeroplane shed (1918).

Construction

Steel construction
Sheds built for rigid airships survive at Moffett Field, California; Akron, Ohio; Weeksville, North Carolina; Lakehurst, New Jersey; Santa Cruz Air Force Base in Brazil; 
and Cardington, Bedfordshire. Steel rigid airship hangars are some of the largest in the world.

Hangar 1, Lakehurst, is located at Naval Air Engineering Station Lakehurst (formerly Naval Air Station Lakehurst), New Jersey. The structure was completed in 1921 and is typical of airship hangar designs of World War I. The site is best known for the Hindenburg disaster, when on May 6, 1937, the German airship Hindenburg crashed and burned while landing. Hangar No.1 at Lakehurst was used to build and store the American USS Shenandoah. The hangar also provided service and storage for the airships USS Los Angeles, Akron, Macon, as well as the Graf Zeppelin and the Hindenburg.

The Goodyear Airdock, is in Akron, Ohio and the structure was completed on November 25, 1929. The Airdock was used for the construction of the USS Akron and her sister ship, the USS Macon.

Hangar One at Moffett Federal Field (formerly Naval Air Station Moffett Field), is located in Mountain View,  California. The structure was completed in 1931. It housed the USS Macon.

Wood construction

The U.S. Navy established more airship operations during WWII. As part of this, ten "lighter-than-air" (LTA) bases across the United States were built as part of the coastal defence plan; a total of 17 hangars were built. Hangars at these bases are some of the world's largest freestanding timber structures. Bases with wooden hangars included: the Naval Air Stations at South Weymouth, Massachusetts (1 hangar); Lakehurst, New Jersey (2); Weeksville, North Carolina (1); Glynco, Georgia (2); Richmond, Florida (3); Houma, Louisiana (1); Hitchcock, Texas (1); Tustin (Santa Ana), California (2); Moffett Field, California (2) and Tillamook, Oregon (2). Of the seventeen, only seven remain, Moffett Federal Field, (former NAS Moffett Field), California (2); former Tustin, California (former NAS Santa Ana and MCAS Tustin), California (2); Tillamook Air Museum/Tillamook Airport (former NAS Tillamook), Oregon (1) and Joint Base McGuire-Dix-Lakehurst/Naval Support Activity Lakehurst (former NAS Lakehurst), New Jersey (2).

Fabric construction

The company went into insolvency and in June 2003, the facilities were sold off and the airship hangar was converted to a 'tropical paradise'-themed indoor holiday resort called Tropical Islands, which opened in 2004.

An alternative to the fixed hangar is a portable shelter that can be used for aircraft storage and maintenance. They are able to accommodate several aircraft and can be increased in size and even relocated when necessary.

Structures and sizes 
Hangars need special structures to be built. The width of the doors have to be large; this includes the aircraft entrance.
The bigger the aircraft to be introduced, the more complex a structure is needed. According to the span of the hangar, sizes can be classified thus:

XXL hangars are built for the largest aircraft in the world like the Airbus A380, Boeing 747 and the Antonov 225, which are the most complex to erect.

Regulation
Hangars are usually regulated by the building codes in the countries and jurisdictions and airports where they reside. In August 2014, the American FAA proposed legislation of how a hangar can be used on airfields that receive government funding. The definition of allowed activities included final assembly of aircraft.

Airship hangars 
Airship hangars or airship sheds are generally larger than conventional aircraft hangars, particularly in height. Most early airships used hydrogen gas to provide them with sufficient buoyancy for flight, so their hangars had to provide protection from stray sparks to keep the gas from exploding. Hangars that held several airships were at risk from chain-reaction explosions. For this reason, most hangars for hydrogen-based airships were built to house only one or two such craft. During the "Golden Age" of airship travel from 1900, mooring masts and sheds were constructed to build and house airships.

Hangars aboard ships

Many warships carry aircraft and will often have hangars for storage and maintenance. Such hangars may be situated adjacent to the flight deck on cruisers, destroyers and frigates or underneath the flight deck with elevators to lift the aircraft on aircraft carriers and amphibious assault ships. On some vessels where space is short the hangar and flight deck share the same space, with the hangar stowing away for flight operations.

Gallery

See also
 Bellman hangar (temporary hangar designed in the United Kingdom in 1936)
 Bessonneau hangar (portable timber and canvas hangar used during World War I)
 Blister hangar (arched portable hangar patented in 1939)
 Archerfield Second World War Igloos Hangar Complex (from February 1943 by the Allied Works Council)
 Double cantilever hangar
 Hangar 18
 Hangar-7
 Loring Air Force Base Arch Hangar, a large hangar constructed for multiple B-36 Peacemaker aircraft
 Military building
 Tee hangar (primarily used for private aircraft at general aviation airports)
 Type-C hangar, built by the Royal Air Force during its Expansion Period (1934 to 1939)
 Underground hangar
 Vehicle Assembly Building, the largest spacecraft hangar ever to exist

References

Further reading
Francis, Paul (1996) ‘British Military Airfield Architecture – From Airships to the Jet Age’ (Patrick Stephens Ltd, Sparkford, Somerset)

External links

 Marine Corps Air Station, Tustin at the California Military Museum  website
 Photo history of British hangars
 Type T2 Hangar Functional Standards 
 Bellman Hangar Functional Standards 
 German Hangar

Hangars